Nusa Laut is an Austronesian language spoken on the island of the same name in the Moluccas in eastern Indonesia.

References

Central Maluku languages
Languages of the Maluku Islands